

Structure and growth in employment
The distribution of main workers in 2001 by different categories reveals that almost 21 percent are cultivators while another 6 percent are agricultural laborers. This is quite understandable in the district where rural population percentage is low as 37 percent. What is remarkable is that the share of population in rural areas has registered a decline from about 37 percent in 1991 to 36 percent in 2001. In the same row cultivators declined from 29.73 percent in 1991 to 21.06 percent and agricultural labourers declined from 8.70 percent to 6.50 percent in 2001. Agricultural fervor of the workforce shows a decline in favour of non-agricultural activities in the state.

Business headquarters
The city is the headquarters of both:

 The Small Industries Development Bank of India (SIDBI) and
 The Pradeshiya Industrial and Investment Corporation of Uttar Pradesh (PICUP).
 The Regional office of the Uttar Pradesh State Industries Development Corporation (UPSIDC) is also located here.

Another business-promoting institutions that has a presence in Lucknow is the Confederation of Indian Industry (CII).

Manufacturing and processing

Among the bigger manufacturing units, Lucknow has:
 Hindustan Aeronautics Limited
 Tata Motors
 Eveready Industries

The city's small-scale and medium-scale industrial units are located in the industrial enclaves of
 Chinhat
 Aishbagh
 Talkatora
 Amausi
 Mohanlalganj
 Arjunganj

Real Estate

Real estate is one of the many booming sectors of the Lucknow's economy. Lucknow has one of the fastest growing property rates in almost all the areas due to redevelopment of several areas (like Gomtinagar and Alambagh) by the present government.

Traditional trade

 Traditionally, Lucknow has been a mandi town for mangoes, melons, and grains grown in the surrounding areas. Sugarcane-growing plantations and sugar industries are also in close proximity. This attracted Edward Dyer to set up a unit based on molasses in the city. Dyer Breweries was incorporated in 1855 and was Asia's first commercial brewery. The company name was changed to Mohan Meakin Brewery in 1967 (the word "Breweries" was dropped in the eighties as the company diversified into other industries).
 Lucknow is famous for its small scale industries that are based on unique styles of embroidery, namely, Chikan and Lakhnawi Zardozi, both of which are significant foreign exchange earners. Chikan has caught the fancy of fashion designers in Bollywood and abroad. It is very popular in Indian markets and have very high demand.
 During the period of the Nawabs, kite-making reached a high level of artistry, and is still a small-scale industry.

 Lucknow has also been an industrial producer of tobacco products like 'Kivam', edible fragrances like 'attars' and handicrafts such as pottery, earthen toys, silver and gold foil work, and bone carving products. The Khadi products of the Gandhi Ashram are also quite popular among the population.

Emerging businesses
 Lucknow, with its excellent education, commercial, banking and legal infrastructure, is witnessing rapid growth in information technology; banking, retailing, construction and other service sectors.
 Commercial property,
 SEZs

 Business centres
 Multiplexes
 Clubs
 Banks
 Food courts
 Entertainment centres
 Finance institutions

The Ministry of Communications and Information Technology set up Software Technology Parks of India in 2001. Currently, biotechnology and information technology are the two focus areas to promote economic development in and around the city. The Ministry of Science and Technology is setting up a biotech park in the city. Lucknow is also one of the selected cities for the Smart City project of STPI.

References